Sefo Kautai (born 16 August 1996) is a New Zealand rugby union player who previously played as a tighthead prop for  in New Zealand's domestic Mitre 10 Cup and for the  in the international Super Rugby competition. He is currently playing for Kobelco Steelers rugby club - which is based in Kobe, Japan.

Senior career

Kautai debuted for Waikato in a Ranfurly Shield defense against King Country in July 2016 and went on to make 11 appearances for the province throughout 2016, scoring one try in the process.

Super Rugby

Kautai's impressive performances anchoring Waikato's scrum saw him earn a Super Rugby contract with Hamilton-based franchise, the  ahead of the 2017 Super Rugby season.

International

Kautai was a member of the New Zealand Under-20 side which competed in the 2016 World Rugby Under 20 Championship in England, making 5 appearances.

References

1996 births
Living people
New Zealand sportspeople of Tongan descent
New Zealand rugby union players
Rugby union props
Waikato rugby union players
People educated at Sacred Heart College, Auckland
Chiefs (rugby union) players
Kobelco Kobe Steelers players
ACT Brumbies players